Kate Slaughter McKinney (February 6, 1859 – March 2, 1939) was an author and poet who used the pen-name of Katydid. In 1931, she was elected Poet Laureate of the State of Alabama.

Early life
Kate Slaughter was born in London, Kentucky, on February 6, 1859, the daughter of James Love Slaughter and Lucinda Jane Price. Her father was born in Booneville, Kentucky, and later moved to London and Richmond, Kentucky. From her father's side she was the great-granddaughter of Gov. Gabriel Slaughter and from her mother side she was the great-granddaughter of Gov. James Garrard. Her great-uncle was Gen. Theo Garrard.

She first attended schools in Kirksville, Kentucky, and then graduated in 1876 from the Daughters' College, Harrodsburg, Kentucky.

Career
Kate Slaughter McKinney wrote verses since she was fifteen years of age. The first were published in The Courier-Journal, from which they found a way into the leading newspapers and magazines.

McKinney got her inspiration from the trees and the flowers and the brooks. Her Kentucky home stood out with frequency in the pages of her published volume, Katydid's Poems (1887). Her other books are: Palace of Silver (1927), The Silent Witness, a Tale of a Kentucky Tragedy (1906), The Weed by the Wall (1911).

She had a lyric gift, and her poems had melody and sweetness.

In 1931 she was elected Poet Laureate of the State of Alabama.

Personal life
On May 7, 1878, she became the wife of James Isaac McKinney, the superintendent of the L. & N. R. R. in Montgomery, Alabama.

She died in Montgomery on March 2, 1939, and is buried at Buffalo Springs Cemetery, Stanford, Kentucky.

References

External links
 

1859 births
1939 deaths
People from London, Kentucky
American women poets
Kentucky women writers
Wikipedia articles incorporating text from A Woman of the Century
19th-century pseudonymous writers
20th-century pseudonymous writers
19th-century American poets
20th-century American poets
Pseudonymous women writers
20th-century American women